Jacob Peterson may refer to:
 Jacob Peterson (soccer)
 Jacob Peterson (ice hockey)